Ritterellidae is a family of tunicates belonging to the order Aplousobranchia.

Genera
The following genera are recognised in the family Ritterellidae:
 Dumus Brewin, 1952
 Pharyngodictyon Herdman, 1886
 Ritterella Harant, 1931

References

Aplousobranchia